The most common religion in Albania is Islam, with the second-most-common religion being Christianity. There are also many irreligious Albanians. There are no official statistics regarding the number of practising religious people per each religious group.

Albania has been a secular state since 1967, and as such, is "neutral in questions of belief and conscience": The former socialist government declared Albania the world's first "atheist state", even though the Soviet Union had already done so.  Believers faced harsh punishments, and many clergymen were killed. Religious observance and practice is generally lax today, and polls have shown that, compared to the populations of other countries, few Albanians consider religion to be a dominant factor in their lives. When asked about religion, people generally refer to their family's historical religious legacy and not to their own choice of faith.

The 2011 census on religion and ethnicity has been deemed unreliable by the Council of Europe as well as other internal and external organisations and groups.

History

Antiquity 

Christianity spread to urban centers in the region of Albania, at the time composed mostly Epirus Nova and part of south Illyricum, during the later period of Roman era and reached the region relatively early. St. Paul preached the Gospel 'even unto Illyricum' (Romans 15:19). Schnabel asserts that Paul probably preached in Shkodra and Durrës. The steady growth of the Christian community in Dyrrhachium (the Roman name for Epidamnus) led to the creation of a local bishopric in 58 AD. Later, episcopal seats were established in Apollonia, Buthrotum (modern Butrint), and Scodra (modern Shkodra).

One notable Martyr was Saint Astius, who was Bishop of Dyrrachium, who was crucified during the persecution of Christians by the Roman Emperor Trajan. Saint Eleutherius (not to be confused with the later Saint-Pope) was bishop of Messina and Illyria. He was martyred along with his mother Anthia during the anti-Christian campaign of Hadrian.

From the 2nd to the 4th centuries, the main language used to spread the Christian religion was Latin, whereas in the 4th to the 5th centuries it was Greek in Epirus and Macedonia and Latin in Praevalitana and Dardania. Christianity spread to the region during the 4th century however the Bible cites in Romans that Christianity was spread in the first century . The following centuries saw the erection of characteristic examples of Byzantine architecture such as the churches in Kosine, Mborje and Apollonia.

Christian bishops from what would later become eastern Albania took part in the First Council of Nicaea. Arianism had at that point extended to Illyria, where Arius himself had been exiled to by Constantine.

Middle Ages 

Since the early 4th century AD, Christianity had become the established religion in the Roman Empire, supplanting pagan polytheism and eclipsing for the most part the humanistic world outlook and institutions inherited from the Greek and Roman civilizations. Ecclesiastical records during the Slavic invasions are slim. Though the country was in the fold of Byzantium, Christians in the region remained under the jurisdiction of the Roman pope until 732. In that year the iconoclast Byzantine emperor Leo III, angered by archbishops of the region because they had supported Rome in the Iconoclastic Controversy, detached the church of the province from the Roman pope and placed it under the patriarch of Constantinople. When the Christian church split in 1054 between the East and Rome, southern Albanian regions retained their ties to Constantinople while the northern areas reverted to the jurisdiction of Rome.

The Albanians first appear in the historical record in Byzantine sources of the 11th century. At this point, they are already fully Christianized. Most Albanian regions belonged to the Eastern Orthodox Church after the schism, but regional Albanian populations gradually became Catholic to secure their independence from various Orthodox political entities and conversions to Catholicism would be especially notable under the aegis of the Kingdom of Albania. Flirtations with conversions to Catholicism in Central Albanian Principality of Arbanon are reported in the later 12th century, but until 1204 Central and Southern Albanians (in Epirus Nova) remained mostly Orthodox despite the growing Catholic influence in the North and were often linked to Byzantine and Bulgarian state entities Krujë, however, became an important center for the spread of Catholicism. Its bishopric had been Catholic since 1167. It was under direct dependence from the pope and it was the pope himself who consecrated the bishop. Local Albanian nobles maintained good relations with the Papacy. Its influence became so great, that it began to nominate local bishops. The Archbishopric of Durrës, one of the primary bishoprics in Albania had initially remained under the authority of Eastern Church after the split despite continuous, but fruitless efforts from the Roman church to convert it to the Latin rite.

After the Fourth Crusade 

However, things changed after the fall of Byzantine Empire in 1204. In 1208, a Catholic archdeacon was elected for the archbishopric of Durrës. After the reconquest of Durrës by the Despotate of Epirus in 1214, the Latin Archbishop of Durrës was replaced by an Orthodox archbishop. According to Etleva Lala, on the edge of the Albanian line in the north was Prizren, which was also an Orthodox bishopric albeit with some Catholic parochial churches, in 1372 received a Catholic bishop due to close relations between the Balsha family and the Papacy.

After the Fourth Crusade, a new wave of Catholic dioceses, churches and monasteries were founded, a number of different religious orders began spreading into the country, and papal missionaries traversed its territories. Those who were not Catholic in Central and North Albania converted and a great number of Albanian clerics and monks were present in the Dalmatian Catholic institutions. The creation of the Kingdom of Albania in 1272, with links to and influence from Western Europe, meant that a decidedly Catholic political structure had emerged, facilitating the further spread of Catholicism in the Balkans. Durrës became again a Catholic archbishopric in 1272. Other territories of the Kingdom of Albania became Catholic centers as well. Butrint in the south, although dependent on Corfu, became Catholic and remained as such during the 14th century. The bishopric of Vlore also converted immediately following the founding of the Kingdom of Albania. Around 30 Catholic churches and monasteries were built during the rule of Helen of Anjou, as Queen consort of the Serbian Kingdom, in North Albania and in Serbia. New bishoprics were created especially in North Albania, with the help of Helen. As Catholic power in the Balkans expanded with Albania as a stronghold, Catholic structures began appearing as far afield as Skopje (which was a mostly Serbian Orthodoxy city at the time) in 1326, with the election of the local bishop there being presided upon by the Pope himself; in the following year, 1327, Skopje sees a Dominican appointed.

However, in Durrës the Byzantine rite continued to exist for a while after Angevin conquest. This double-line of authority created some confusion in the local population and a contemporary visitor of the country described Albanians as nor they are entirely Catholic or entirely schismatic. In order to fight this religious ambiguity, in 1304, Dominicans were ordered by Pope Benedict XI to enter the country and to instruct the locals in the Latin rite. Dominican priests were also ordered as bishops in Vlorë and Butrint.

In 1332 a Dominican priest reported that within the Kingdom of Rascia (Serbia) there were two Catholic peoples, the "Latins" and the "Albanians", who both had their own language. The former was limited to coastal towns while the latter was spread out over the countryside, and while the language of the Albanians was noted as quite different from Latin, both peoples are noted as writing with Latin letters. The author, an anonymous Dominican priest, writing in favor of a Western Catholic military action to expel Orthodox Serbia from areas of Albania it controlled in order to restore the power of the Catholic church there, argued that the Albanians and Latin and their clerics were suffering under the "extremely dire bondage of their odious Slav leaders whom they detest" and would eagerly support an expedition of " one thousand French knights and five or six thousand foot soldiers" who, with, their help, could throw off the rule of Rascia.

Although Serbian rulers at earlier times had at times relations with the Catholic West despite being Orthodox, as a counterbalance to Byzantine power, and therefore tolerated the spread of Catholicism in their lands, under the reign of Stephan Dushan the Catholics were persecuted, as were also Orthodox bishops loyal to Constantinople. The Catholic rite was called Latin heresy and, angered in part by marriages of Serbian Orthodox with "half-believers" and the Catholic proselytization of Serbians, Dushan's code, the Zakonik contained harsh measures against them. However, the persecutions of local Catholics did not begin in 1349 when the Code was declared in Skopje, but much earlier, at least since the beginning of the 14th century. Under these circumstances the relations between local Catholic Albanians and the papal curia became very close, while the previously friendly relations between local Catholics and Serbians deteriorated significantly.

Between 1350 and 1370, the spread of Catholicism in Albania reached its peak. At that period there were around seventeen Catholic bishoprics in the country, which acted not only as centers for Catholic reform within Albania, but also as centers for missionary activity in the neighboring areas, with the permission of the pope. At the end of the 14th century, the previously Orthodox Autocephalous Archbishopric of Ohrid was dismantled in favor of the Catholic rite.

Renaissance 

Christianity was later overshadowed by Islam, which became the predominant religion during the invasion from the Ottoman Empire from the 15th century until the year 1912. Many Albanians embraced Islam in different ways.

Albania differs from other regions in the Balkans in that the peak of Islamization in Albania occurred much later: 16th century Ottoman census data showed that sanjaks where Albanians lived remained overwhelmingly Christian with Muslims making up no more than 5% in most areas (Ohrid 1.9%, Shkodra 4.5%, Elbasan 5.5%, Vlora 1.8%, Dukagjin 0%) while during this period Muslims had already risen to large proportions in Bosnia (Bosnia 46%, Herzegovina 43%, urban Sarajevo 100%), Northern Greece (Trikala 17.5%), North Macedonia (Skopje and Bitola both at 75%) and Eastern Bulgaria (Silistra 72%, Chirmen 88%, Nikopol 22%). Later on, in the 19th century, when the process of Islamization had halted in most of the Balkans and some Balkan Christian peoples like Greeks and Serbs had already claimed independence, Islamization continued to make significant progress in Albania, especially in the South.

As a rule, Ottoman rule largely tolerated Christian subjects but it also discriminated against them, turning them into second-class citizens with much higher taxes and various legal restrictions like being unable to take Muslims to court, have horses, have weapons, or have houses overlooking those of Muslims. While Catholicism was chronically held in suspicion by Ottoman authorities, after the conquest of Constantinople, the Ottomans largely allowed the Orthodox church to function unhindered, except during periods when the church was considered politically suspect and thus suppressed with expulsions of bishops and seizure of property and revenues. Conversion during Ottoman times was variously due to calculated attempts to improve social and economic status, due to the successful proselytizing by missionaries, or done out of desperation in very difficult times; in the latter case, the converts often practised crypto-Christianity for long periods. During the Ottoman period, most Christians as well as most Muslims employed a degree of syncretism, still practising various pagan rites; many of these rites are best preserved among mystical orders like the Bektashi.

Unlike some other areas of the Balkans, such as Bulgaria and Bosnia, for the first couple centuries of Ottoman rule, up until the 1500s, Islam remained confined to members of the co-opted aristocracy and a couple scattered military settlements of Yuruks from Anatolia, while the native Albanian peasantry remained overwhelmingly Christian. Even long after the fall of Skanderbeg, large regions of the Albanian countryside frequently rebelled against Ottoman rule, often incurring large human costs, including the decimation of whole villages. In the 1570s, a concerted effort by Ottoman rulers to convert the native population to Islam in order to stop the occurrence of seasonal rebellions began in Elbasan and Reka. In 1594, the Pope incited a failed rebellion among Catholic Albanians in the North, promising help from Spain. However the assistance did not come, and when the rebellion was crushed in 1596, Ottoman repression and heavy pressures to convert to Islam were implemented to punish the rebels.

Between 1500 and 1800, impressive ecclesiastical art flourished across Southern Albania. In Moscopole there were over 23 churches during the city's period of prosperity in the mid 18th century. Post-Byzantine architectural style is prevalent in the region, e.g. in Vithkuq, Labove, Mesopotam, Dropull.

Christianity and Islam in the North under Ottoman Rule 

Ramadan Marmullaku noted that, in the 1600s, the Ottomans organized a concerted campaign of Islamization that was not typically applied elsewhere in the Balkans, in order to ensure the loyalty of the rebellious Albanian population. Although there were certain instances of violently forced conversion, usually this was achieved through debatably coercive economic incentives – in particular, the head tax on Christians was drastically increased. While the tax levied on Albanian Christians in the 1500s amounted to about 45 akçes, in the mid-1600s, it was 780 akçes. Conversion to Islam here was also aided by the dire state of the Catholic church in the period— in the entirety of Albania, there were only 130 Catholic priests, many of these poorly educated. During this period, many Christian Albanians fled into the mountains to found new villages like Theth, or to other countries where they contributed to the emergence of Arvanites, Arbëreshë, and Arbanasi communities in Greece, Italy, and Croatia. While in the first decade of the 17th century, Central and Northern Albania remained firmly Catholic (according to Vatican reports, Muslims were no more than 10% in Northern Albania), by the middle of the 17th century, 30–50% of Northern Albania had converted to Islam, while by 1634 most of Kosovo had also converted. During this time, the Venetian Republic helped to prevent the wholesale Islamisation of Albania, maintaining a hold on parts of the north near the coast.

This period also saw the emergence of Albanian literature, written by Christians such as Pjetër Bogdani. Some of these Christian Albanian thinkers, like Bogdani himself, ultimately advocated for an Albania outside of Ottoman control, and at the end of the 17th century, Bogdani and his colleague Raspasani, raised an army of thousands of Kosovar Albanians in support of the Austrians in the Great Turkish War. However, when this effort failed to expel Ottoman rule from the area yet again, many of Kosovo's Catholics fled to Hungary.

In 1700, the Papacy passed to Pope Clement XI, who was himself of Albanian-Italian origins and held great interest in the welfare of his Catholic Albanian kinsmen, known for composing the Illyricum sacrum. In 1703 he convened the Albanian Council (Kuvendi i Arbënit) in order to organize methods to prevent further apostacy in Albania, and preserve the existence of Catholicism in the land. The widespread survival of Catholicism in northern Albania is largely attributable to the activity of the Franciscan order in the area

In addition to Catholicism and Sunni Islam, there were pockets of Orthodox (some of whom had converted from Catholicism) in Kavajë, Durrës, Upper Reka and some other regions, while Bektashis became established in Kruja, Luma, Bulqiza, Tetova, and Gjakova. Especially in the tribal regions of the North, religious differences were often mitigated by common cultural and tribal characteristics, as well as knowledge of family lineages connecting Albanian Christians and Albanian Muslims. In the 17th century, although many of the rebellions of the century were at least in part motivated by Christian sentiment, it was noted that many Albanian Muslims also took part, and that, despising Ottoman rule no less than their Christian brethren, Albanian Muslims would revolt eagerly if only given the slightest assistance from the Catholic West.

Christianity and Islam in the South under Ottoman Rule 

In the late 17th and 18th centuries, especially after numerous rebellions including during the Great Turkish War and subsequent clashes with Orthodox Russia, Ottoman rulers also made concerted efforts to convert the Orthodox Albanians of Southern and Central Albania (as well as neighboring regions of Greece and Macedonia). Like in the North, conversion was achieved through a diverse motley of violent, coercive and non-coercive means, but raised taxes were the main factor. Nevertheless, there were specific local cases: in Vlora and the surrounding region, the Christians converted en masse once the area was recaptured from the Christian forces in 1590, because they feared violent retribution for their collaboration. In Labëri, meanwhile, mass conversion took place during a famine in which the bishop of Himara and Delvina was said to have forbidden the people from breaking the fast and consuming milk under threat of interminable hell. Across Orthodox regions of Albania, conversion was also helped by the presence of heresies like Arianism and the fact that much of the Orthodox clergy was illiterate, corrupt, and conducted sermons in Greek, a foreign language, as well as the poverty of the Orthodox church. The clergy, largely from the Bosphorus, was distant from its Albanian flocks and also corrupt as well, abusing church tax collection and exacting a heavy tax regime that aggregated on top of punitive taxes imposed directly by the Ottoman state on the rebellious Albanian Christian population aimed at sparking their conversion.

Orthodox areas further north, such as those around Elbasan, were first to convert, during the 1700s, passing through a stage of Crypto-Christianity although in these regions scattered Orthodox holdouts remained (such as around Berat, in Zavalina, and the quite large region of Myzeqe including Fier and Lushnjë) as well as continuing Crypto-Christianity around the region of Shpati among others, where Crypto-Christians formally reverted to Orthodoxy in 1897. Further south, progress was slower. The region of Gjirokastra did not become majority Muslim until around 1875, and even then most Muslims were concentrated in the city of Gjirokastra itself. The same trajectory was true of Albanians in Chamëria, with the majority of Cham Albanians remaining Orthodox until around 1875— at which point Ottoman rule in the Balkans was already collapsing and many Christian Balkan states had already claimed independence (Greece, Serbia, Romania).

At the end of the Ottoman period, Sunni Islam held a slight majority (or plurality) in the Albanian territories. Catholicism still prevailed in the Northwestern regions surrounding Lezha and Shkodra, as well as a few pockets in Kosovo in and around Gjakova, Peja, Vitina, Prizren and Klina. Orthodoxy remained prevalent in various pockets of Southern and Central Albania (Myzeqeja, Zavalina, Shpati as well as large parts of what are now the counties of Vlora, Gjirokastra and Korca). The syncretic Bektashi sect, meanwhile, gained adherence across large parts of the South, especially Skrapari and Dishnica where it is the overwhelming majority. This four-way division of Albanians between Sunnis (who became either a plurality or a majority), Orthodox, Bektashis and Catholics, with the later emergence of Albanian Uniates, Protestants and atheists, prevented Albanian nationalism as it emerged from tying itself to any particular faith, instead promoting harmony between the different confessions and using the shared Albanian language, Albanian history and Albanian ethnic customs as unifying themes. Despite this, Bektashi tekkes in the South and Catholic churches in the North were both used by the nationalist movement as places of dissemination of nationalist ideals.

Modern

Independence 

During the 20th century after Independence (1912) the democratic, monarchic and later the totalitarian regimes followed a systematic dereligionization of the nation and the national culture. Albania never had an official state religion either as a republic or as a kingdom after its restoration in 1912. Religious tolerance in Albania was born of national expediency and a general lack of religious convictions.

Monarchy 

Originally under the monarchy, institutions of all confessions were put under state control. In 1923, following the government program, the Albanian Muslim congress convened at Tirana decided to break with the Caliphate, established a new form of prayer (standing, instead of the traditional salah ritual), banished polygamy and did away with the mandatory use of veil (hijab) by women in public, which had been forced on the urban population by the Ottomans during the occupation.

In 1929 the Albanian Orthodox Church was declared autocephalous.

A year later, in 1930, the first official religious census was carried out. Reiterating conventional Ottoman data from a century earlier which previously covered double the new state's territory and population, 50% of the population was grouped as Sunni Muslim, 20% as Orthodox Christian, 20% as Bektashi Muslim and 10% as Catholic Christian.

The monarchy was determined that religion should no longer be a foreign-oriented master dividing the Albanians, but a nationalized servant uniting them. It was at this time that newspaper editorials began to disparage the almost universal adoption of Muslim and Christian names, suggesting instead that children be given neutral Albanian names.

Official slogans began to appear everywhere. "Religion separates, patriotism unites." "We are no longer Muslim, Orthodox, Catholic, we are all Albanians." "Our religion is Albanism." The national hymn characterized neither Muhammad nor Jesus Christ, but King Zogu as "Shpëtimtari i Atdheut" (Savior of the Fatherland). The hymn to the flag honored the soldier dying for his country as a "Saint." Increasingly the mosque and the church were expected to function as servants of the state, the patriotic clergy of all faiths preaching the gospel of Albanism.

Monarchy stipulated that the state should be neutral, with no official religion and that the free exercise of religion should be extended to all faiths. Neither in government nor in the school system should favor be shown to any one faith over another. Albanism was substituted for religion, and officials and schoolteachers were called "apostles" and "missionaries." Albania's sacred symbols were no longer the cross and the crescent, but the Flag and the King. Hymns idealizing the nation, Skanderbeg, war heroes, the king and the flag predominated in public-school music classes to the exclusion of virtually every other theme.

The first reading lesson in elementary schools introduced a patriotic catechism beginning with this sentence, "I am an Albanian. My country is Albania." Then there follows in poetic form, "But man himself, what does he love in life?" "He loves his country." "Where does he live with hope? Where does he want to die?" "In his country." "Where may he be happy, and live with honor?" "In Albania."

Italian occupation 
On 7 April 1939, Albania was invaded by Italy under Benito Mussolini, which had long taken an interest in gaining dominance over Albania as an Italian sphere of influence during the interwar period. The Italians attempted to win the sympathies of the Muslim Albanian population by proposing to build a large mosque in Rome, though the Vatican opposed this measure and nothing came of it in the end. The Italian occupiers also won Muslim Albanian sympathies by causing their working wages to rise. Mussolini's son-in-law Count Ciano also replaced the leadership of the Sunni Muslim community, which had recognized the Italian regime in Albania, with clergy that aligned with Italian interests, with a compliant "Moslem Committee" organization, and Fischer notes that "the Moslem community at large accepted this change with little complaint". Most of the Bektashi order and its leadership were against the Italian occupation and remained an opposition group. Fischer suspects that the Italians eventually tired of the opposition of the Bektashi Order, and had its head, Nijaz Deda, murdered.

The Albanian Orthodox hierarchy also acquiesced in the occupation, according to Fischer. The primate of the church, Archbishop Kisi, along with three other bishops, expressed formal approval of the Italian invasion in 1939.  Metropolitan Visarion Xhuvani was part of the delegation which carried the Albanian throne to Victor Emanuel III in Rome.

The Catholic Church and many Catholics were supportive of the invasion, but Fischer states there were many exceptions, particularly of among the village priests since most of them were trained in Albania and were quite nationalistic. Some of them even left Albania after the Italian invasion. But the hierarchy on the other hand was quite supportive, with the apostolic delegate seeing it as a possibility to give more freedom to Albanians who wanted to become Catholic. The Catholic Church had also the most financial support per member during the Italian occupation.

Communism 

Before the Communists took power in 1944, it was estimated that of Albania's population of roughly 1,180,500 persons, about 70% belonged to Islamic sects while 30% belonged to Christian sects. Among the Muslims, at least 200,000 (or 17%) were Bektashis, while most of the rest were Sunnis, in addition to a collection of much smaller orders. Among the Christians, 212,500 (18%) were Orthodox while 142,000 (12%) were Catholic.

The Agrarian Reform Law of August 1946 nationalized most property of religious institutions, including the estates of monasteries, orders, and dioceses. Many clergy and believers were tried, tortured, and executed. All foreign Roman Catholic priests, monks, and nuns were expelled in 1946.

Religious communities or branches that had their headquarters outside the country, such as the Jesuit and Franciscan orders, were henceforth ordered to terminate their activities in Albania. Religious institutions were forbidden to have anything to do with the education of the young, because that had been made the exclusive province of the state. All religious communities were prohibited from owning real estate and from operating philanthropic and welfare institutions and hospitals.
Although there were tactical variations in First Secretary of the Communist Party Enver Hoxha's approach to each of the major denominations, his overarching objective was the eventual destruction of all organized religion in Albania. Between 1945 and 1953, the number of priests was reduced drastically and the number of Roman Catholic churches was decreased from 253 to 100, and all Catholics were stigmatized as fascists.

The campaign against religion peaked in the 1960s. Beginning in 1967 the Albanian authorities began a violent campaign to try to eliminate religious life in Albania. Despite complaints, even by Party of Labour of Albania members, all churches, mosques, tekkes, monasteries, and other religious institutions were either closed down or converted into warehouses, gymnasiums, or workshops by the end of 1967. By May 1967, religious institutions had been forced to relinquish all 2,169 churches, mosques, cloisters, and shrines in Albania, many of which were converted into cultural centres for young people. As the literary monthly Nendori reported the event, the youth had thus "created the first atheist nation in the world."

The clergy were publicly vilified and humiliated, their vestments taken and desecrated. More than 200 clerics of various faiths were imprisoned, others were forced to seek work in either industry or agriculture, and some were executed or starved to death. The monastery of the Franciscan order in Shkodër was set on fire, which resulted in the death of four elderly monks.

A major center for anti-religious propaganda was the National Museum of Atheism in Shkodër, the city viewed by the government as the most religiously conservative.

Article 37 of the Albanian Constitution of 1976 stipulated, "The State recognises no religion, and supports atheistic propaganda in order to implant a scientific materialistic world outlook in the people", and the penal code of 1977 imposed prison sentences of three to ten years for "religious propaganda and the production, distribution, or storage of religious literature." A new decree that in effect targeted Albanians with Islamic and religiously-tinged Christian names stipulated that citizens whose names did not conform to "the political, ideological, or moral standards of the state" were to change them. It was also decreed that towns and villages with religious names must be renamed. Hoxha's brutal antireligious campaign succeeded in eradicating formal worship, but some Albanians continued to practise their faith clandestinely, risking severe punishment. Individuals caught with Bibles, icons, or other religious objects faced long prison sentences. Religious weddings were prohibited. Parents were afraid to pass on their faith, for fear that their children would tell others. Officials tried to entrap practising Christians and Muslims during religious fasts, such as Lent and Ramadan, by distributing food at schools and workplaces during those fasting hours, and then publicly denouncing those who refused to eat during such times, and clergy who conducted secret services were incarcerated.

The article was interpreted as violating The United Nations Charter (chapter 9, article 55) which declares that religious freedom is an inalienable human right. The first time that the question of religious oppression in Albania came before the United Nations' Commission on Human Rights at Geneva was as late as 7 March 1983. A delegation from Denmark got its protest over Albania's violation of religious liberty placed on the agenda of the thirty-ninth meeting of the commission, item 25, reading, "Implementation of the Declaration on the Elimination of all Forms of Intolerance and of Discrimination based on Religion or Belief." There was little consequence at first, but on 20 July 1984 a member of the Danish Parliament inserted an article in one of Denmark's major newspapers protesting the violation of religious freedom in Albania.

After the death of Enver Hoxha in 1985, his successor, Ramiz Alia, adopted a relatively tolerant stance toward religious practice, referring to it as "a personal and family matter." Émigré clergymen were permitted to reenter the country in 1988 and officiate at religious services. Mother Teresa, an ethnic Albanian, visited the country in 1989, where she was received in Tirana by the foreign minister and by Hoxha's widow and where she laid a wreath on Hoxha's grave. In December 1990, the ban on religious observance was officially lifted, in time to allow thousands of Christians to attend Christmas services.

The atheistic campaign had significant results especially to the Greek minority, since religion which was now criminalized was traditionally an integral part of its cultural life and identity.

Religions

Islam 

Islam was first introduced to Albania in the 15th century after the Ottoman conquest of the area. It is the largest religion in the country, representing 56% of the population according to the 2011 census. One of the major legacies of nearly five centuries of Ottoman rule was that the majority of Albanians had converted to Islam. Therefore, the nation emerged as a Muslim-majority country after Albania's independence in November 1912.

In the North, the spread of Islam was slower due to the resistance of the Roman Catholic Church and the region's mountainous terrain. In the center and south, however, Catholicism was not as strong and by the end of the 17th century the region had largely adopted the religion of the growing Albanian Muslim elite. The existence of an Albanian Muslim class of pashas and beys who played an increasingly important role in Ottoman political and economic life became an attractive career option for most Albanians. Widespread illiteracy and the absence of educated clergy also played roles in the spread of Islam, especially in northern Albanian-inhabited regions. During the 17th and 18th centuries Albanians converted to Islam in large numbers, often under sociopolitical duress experienced as repercussions for rebelling and for supporting the Catholic powers of Venice and Austria and Orthodox Russia in their wars against the Ottomans.

In the 20th century, the power of Muslim, Catholic and Orthodox clergy was weakened during the years of monarchy and it was eradicated during the 1940s and 1950s, under the state policy of obliterating all organized religion from Albanian territories.

During the Ottoman invasion the Muslims of Albania were divided into two main communities: those associated with Sunni Islam and those associated with Bektashi Shiism, a mystical Dervish order that came to Albania through the Albanian Janissaries that served in the Ottoman army and whose members practised Albanian pagan rites under a nominal Islamic cover. After the Bektashis were banned in Turkey in 1925 by Atatürk, the order moved its headquarters to Tirana and the Albanian government subsequently recognized it as a body independent from Sunnism. Sunni Muslims were estimated to represent approximately 50% of the country's population before 1939, while Bektashi represented another 20%. There is also a relatively small minority which belongs to the Ahmadiyya Muslim Community. Muslim populations have been particularly strong in eastern and northern Albania and among Albanians living in Kosovo and Macedonia.

Islam (Sunni) 

Sunni Muslims have historically lived in the cities of Albania, while Bektashis mainly live in remote areas, whereas Orthodox Christians mainly live in the south, and Roman Catholics mainly live in the north of the country. However, this division does not apply nowadays. In a study by Pew Research, 65% of Albanian Muslims did not specify a branch of Islam that they belonged to. The Albanian census doesn't differentiate between Bektashis and Sunnis, but instead between Bektashis and "Muslims", but since Bektashis are in fact Muslim many were listed as Muslims. Bektashi-majority areas include Skrapari, Dishnica, Erseka and Bulqiza while Bektashis also have large, possibly majority concentrations in Kruja, Mallakastra, Tepelena, large pockets of the Gjirokastër and Delvina Districts (i.e. Gjirokastër itself, Lazarat, etc.), and Western and Northeastern parts of the Vlora district. There are also historically substantial Bektashi minorities around Elbasan, Berat, Leskovik, Perm, Saranda and Pogradec. In Kosovo and Macedonia there were pockets of Bektashis in Gjakova, Prizren and Tetova. In the Albanian census, a few of these areas, such as Skrapari and Dishnica, saw the Bektashi population mostly labeled "Bektashi" while in most other areas such as Kruja it was mostly labeled "Muslim". The classification of children of mixed marriages between Sunnis and Bektashis or the widespread phenomenon of both groups marrying Orthodox Albanians also have inconsistent classification and oftentimes the offspring of such unions associate with both of their parents' faiths and occasionally practice both.

In December 1992 Albania became a full member of the Organisation of the Islamic Conference (now the Organisation of Islamic Cooperation).

Bektashism 

The Bektashi Order was widespread in the Ottoman Empire, with most leading Bektashi babas from southern Albania. The Bektashi order was banned throughout the Ottoman Empire by Sultan Mahmud II in 1826. After  Mustafa Kemal Atatürk banned all Sufi orders in 1925, the Bektashi leadership moved to Albania and established their headquarters in the city of Tirana, where the community declared its separation from the Sunni. Under communist rule from 1945 - 1990, Bektashism was banned in Albania.

Many "tekkes" (lodges) operate today in Albania. Approximately 20% of Muslims identify themselves as having some connection to Bektashism.

Other Sufi congregations 

Of the remaining mystical orders in Albania besides the Bektashi, there are those that associate with the mainline Sunni establishment, as well as those who feel themselves to be distant from both the Sunnis and Bektashis, and in terms of organization have oscillated between association with the Sunni establishment, with the Bektashis, and as their own independent organization. Today, these sects, the largest of them being the Halveti Order, and are organized and collectively referred to in Albania as the "Alevian Community" or the "Alevian Sects". There are other mystical orders who associate more with the Sunni establishment. There is no known direct relation of Alevjans to Turkish Alevis or Syrian Alawites except their ambiguous position between Sunnism and Shi'ism, also a characteristic of Bektashism.

The Halveti order first started to spread in Southern Albania in the 16th century and gained many followers later. They are considered to be less numerous than the Bektashis (and occasionally confused with them) but still significant. During periods of suppression of the Bektashis by the Ottoman authorities, Bektashi tekkes were often conferred upon the Halvetis, such as happened in Kanina, near Vlora There are large concentrations of Halvetis in Devoll, Tropoja, Luma (around Kukes) and in mountainous valleys in the Kurvelesh region. Halvetis also live near Bektashis in Mallakastra, Tepelena, Gjirokastra, Delvina, Permet, Leskovik, Korca, and the city of Berat. The first Albanian Halveti tekke however was in Ioannina, now Greece. After the fall of communism, in 1998, it was reported that there were 42 Bektashi tekkes in Albania. On the census Halvetis are not reported and are usually grouped under generalized "Muslims", although in public discourse they are frequently grouped with Bektashis. Halvetis are said to dislike both the dominance of mainline Sunnis in the generic "Muslim" community and the non-recognition of their sect's separate existence, but also the dominance of Bektashis in the Sufi scene.

Besides the two most popular Dervish orders in Albania (Bektashis and Halvetis), there are three other significant Sufi orders: the Kadris (also known as "Kadris" or "Zinxhiris"), the Sadis and the Rufais.

The Rufais originated in Iraq as the "Rifa'is", from the teachings of the jurist Ahmad ibn 'Ali al-Rifa'i.  In the late 19th century there was a flourishing Rufai community around Gjakova, in Kosovo, which helped spread the sect in various parts of Albania. During the early years of the 20th century some Rufai tekkes became Bektashi. At the same time, in the same period the order spread to Tropoja, Tirana, Petrela and parts of Southern Albania. In Albania all of their tekkes were closed due to the banning of religion under Communism, but in Yugoslavia the order continued to operate major tekkes in Gjakova, Mitrovica, Skopje, Peja, Rahovec and Prizren. After the fall of Communism, the order reconstituted itself in Albania and opened a tekke in Tirana in 1998.

The Sa'dis originated in Damascus and in Albania have a close relationship with the Bektashis. Both were favored by Ali Pasha and they looked after and venerated each other's holy places and tombs. There was a Sa'di tekke in Gjakova in 1600, and two Sa'di tekkes in Tepelena two centuries later, as well as some historical presence in Tropoja, Gjirokastër, Elbasan and Peza. In 1980 in Kosovo, there are 10 operating Sa'di tekkes.<ref>Elsie, Robert. Historical Dictionary of Albania. Pages 393–4.</ref>

The Kadris first originated as a distinct sect in Istanbul in the 17th century, then were spread to the Balkans as the "Zindjiris" by Ali Baba of Crete, originally spreading from within the Bektashi community. There are Kadri tekkes in Tirana, Berat and Peqin, but the main center of the Kadris is Peshkopia in Diber County. In 1945 they were finally recognized as a distinct religious community; since the fall of Communism, they have reconstituted themselves and now have an operating tekke in Peshkopia.

 Christianity 

 Roman Catholicism 

In the 2011 census, about 10.03% of Albania's population declared Roman Catholic Christianity as of 2011 census. Albania once numbered eighteen episcopal Sees, some of them having uninterrupted activity from the dawn of the Catholicism until today. The country has been a Roman Catholic bridgehead in the Balkans, with Catholic Albanians playing a role not unlike the Croats in the former Yugoslavia. In the Middle Ages, Albania was ruled by many Catholic rulers, including natives but notably the Angevins and it became a site of the spread of Catholicism in the Balkans at the expense of Orthodoxy as previously Orthodox Albanian nobles and their subjects converted as they grew increasingly loyal to the Western powers as a way to fend off threats coming from Orthodox political entities. Despite the ascendance of Catholicism at the time, Orthodox minorities remained. Before long, Durrës and Kruja became major centers of Balkan Catholicism, and in 1167 it was a significant event when Kruja became a Catholic bishopric, with the new bishop consecrated by the Pope himself. Vlora and Butrint also saw Catholicization, and at the peak of Catholic power in the Balkans with Albania as a stronghold, Catholic structures began appearing as far afield as Skopje in 1326. At the end of the 14th century, the previously Orthodox Autocephalous Archbishopric of Ohrid was dismantled in favor of the Catholic rite.

However, Ottoman rule ultimately vastly decreased the number of Catholics in Albania and elsewhere in the Balkans, with waves of conversions to Islam and to a lesser extent Orthodoxy occurring especially in the 17th century after a series of failed rebellions and punitive measures which involved drastic raises in the taxes of the Catholic population. The tribal population of Mirdita saw very few conversions because the ease they had defending their terrain meant the Ottomans interfered less in their affairs, and the Republic of Venice prevented Islamisation in Venetian Albania. Today, Catholic Albanians are mostly found in the areas of Malesia e Madhe, Kiri, Puka, Tropoja (where they are a minority), Mirdita, parts of northwestern Mat, Kurbin, Lezhe, Zadrima, Shkodër and Ulqin (where they live alongside very large numbers of Sunni Muslims), minorities in Kruja and some major cities, as well as scattered pockets throughout Gheg-inhabited areas. While there remained a small Albanian Catholic community in Vlore during Ottoman times, larger numbers of Catholics started were reported in the South after the fall of Communism, often in traditionally Orthodox areas.

For four centuries, the Catholic Albanians defended their faith, aided by Franciscan missionaries, beginning in the middle of the 17th century, when persecution by Ottoman Turkish lords in Albania started to result in the conversion of many villages to the Islamic faith.

The College of Propaganda at Rome played a significant role in the religious and moral support of the Albanian Catholics. During the 17th and 18th centuries, the College contributed in educating young clerics appointed to service on Albanian missions, as well as to the financial support of the churches. Work was done by the Austrian Government at the time, which offered significant financial aid in its role as Protector of the Christian community under Ottoman rule.

Church legislation of the Albanians was reformed by Clement XI, who convoked a general ecclesiastical visitation, held in 1763 by the Archbishop of Antivari, by the end of which a national synod was held. The decrees formulated by the Synod were printed by the College of Propaganda in 1705, and renewed in 1803. In 1872, Pius IX convoked a second national synod at Shkodër, for the revival of the popular and ecclesiastical life. Owing to Austrian interest in Albania, the institution of the Catholic bishops of Albania was obtained through a civil decree released by the Vilajet of Berat.

Albania was divided ecclesiastically into several archiepiscopal provinces:
 Tivari Since 1878 part of the principality of Montenegro. Since 1886, it has been separate from Scutari, with which it had been united in 1867 on equal terms.
 Scutari, with the suffragan Sees of Alessio, Pulati, Sappa and (since 1888) the Abbatia millius of St. Alexander of Orosci.
 Durazzo
 Uskup
The last two archiepiscopal provinces did not have any suffragans, and depended directly on the Holy See. A seminary, founded in 1858 by Archbishop Topich of Scutari, was destroyed by the Ottomans, but was later re-established on Austrian territory and placed under imperial protection.

 Eastern Orthodoxy 

According to the 2011 Census, 6.75% of the Albanian population adhere to the Albanian Orthodox Church. Three ethnic groups, Albanians, Greeks, and Aromanians, account for the vast majority of Albania's Orthodox believers. Metropolitan Theofan Fan Noli established the Albanian Orthodox Mission under the American diocese.

Although Orthodox Christianity has existed in Albania since the 2nd century AD, and the Orthodox historically constituted 20% of the population  of Albania, the first Orthodox liturgy in the Albanian language was celebrated not in Albania, but in Massachusetts. Subsequently, when the Orthodox Church was allowed no official existence in communist Albania, Albanian Orthodoxy survived in exile in Boston (1960–89). It is a curious history that closely entwines Albanian Orthodoxy with the Bay State. 

Between 1890 and 1920, approximately 25,000 Albanians, the majority of them Orthodox Christians from southeastern Albania, emigrated to the United States, settling in and around Boston. Like many other Orthodox immigrants, they were predominantly young, illiterate, male peasants. Like so many other Balkan immigrants, a large number (almost 10,000) returned to their homeland after World War I. 

Since the 2nd century AD, the liturgical services, schools and activities of the Orthodox Church in Albania had been conducted in Greek. When Albania came under Ottoman influence in the 15th century the Orthodox people of Albania were members of the Archbishopric of Ohrid which was officially recognized by the Ottoman Empire.

Those Albanian Orthodox, who, in the fashion of 19th century Balkan nationalism, sought to see their church as an Albanian rather than Greek body, were frequently excommunicated by the Greek-speaking hierarchy. Considering that identity during the Ottoman centuries was defined primarily by religious affiliations, such questions in the post-Ottoman period loomed large in the burgeoning national and cultural identities. After the Ecumenical Patriarchate in Constantinople lost in 1870 jurisdictional control over the Bulgarians in the Ottoman Empire, the Patriarchate did not desire further schisms within its ranks. Indeed, so strong was the rivalry of Greeks with Orthodox Albanians who opted for separate cultural activities, that some of the latter category such as Papa Kristo Negovani, a priest educated in Greek schools, Sotir Ollani, Petro Nini Luarasi, Nuci Naco and others were murdered for their patriotic efforts.

Nationalist fervor ran high in Albanian immigrant communities in North America.  When, in 1906, a Greek priest from an independent Greek parish in Hudson, Massachusetts, refused to bury an Albanian nationalist, an outraged Albanian community petitioned the missionary diocese to assist them in establishing a separate Albanian-language parish within the missionary diocese.  Fan Noli, an ardent Albanian nationalist and former parish cantor, was subsequently ordained in February 1908 by a sympathetic Metropolitan Platon to serve this new Albanian parish. Noli went on to organize five additional Albanian parishes, mainly in Massachusetts, as an Albanian Orthodox Mission in America under the auspices of the American diocese.
Noli later emigrated to Albania, served as the Albanian delegate to the League of Nations, was consecrated Bishop and Primate of the independent Orthodox Church in Albania in 1923, and even served briefly as Prime Minister of Albania (came in power with the so-called The Revolution of 1924) but was overthrown in a coup by Ahmet Zogu on the same year. After years in exile in Germany, Noli returned to the United States in 1932, studied at Harvard, translated Shakespeare into Albanian and Orthodox Scriptures and services into English, and led the Albanian Orthodox community in this country until his death in 1965. 

 Greek Catholicism 
The Albanian Greek Catholic Church exists in southern Albania and is under an Apostolic Administration.  It has less than 4,000 members.

 Protestantism 

In the early 19th century, in accordance with the Protestant practice of making the Scriptures available to all people in their common tongue, the British and Foreign Bible Society began to make plans for the translation, printing, and distribution of the New Testament in Albanian. Soon Alexander Thomson, a Scottish missionary, joined the Society and visited Albania in 1863. Kostandin Kristoforidhi also joined the Society to translate the Scriptures in both Geg and Tosk dialects. In the late 19th century the Society's workers traveled throughout Albania distributing Bibles, under the leadership of Gjerasim Qiriazi who converted, preached the Gospel in Korça, and became the head of the first "Evangelical Brotherhood". Qiriazi sought official government recognition for the Albanian Evangelical Church in 1887, a pursuit which would not be fulfilled until 10 March 2011 by Law No. 10394.

 Judaism 

The history of the Jews in Albania dates back at least 2,000 years dating back to 70 CE. Albanian Jews, predominantly Sephardi, have only constituted a very small percentage of the population in modern times .

In 1673 the charismatic Jewish prophet Sabbatai Zevi was exiled by the Turkish sultan to the Albanian port of Ulqin, now in Montenegro, dying there some years later.

Over the course of World War II Albania saw its Jewish population increase. During the communist dictatorship of Enver Hoxha, the Socialist People's Republic of Albania banned all religions, including Judaism, in adherence to the doctrine of state atheism. In the post-Communist era, these policies were abandoned and freedom of religion was extended, although the number of practising Jews in Albania today remains small, with many Jews having made aliyah to Israel. Today Jews number around 150. In December 2010 Israeli Chief Rabbi Shlomo Amar installed Rabbi Yoel Kaplan as the country's first Chief Rabbi. Recognition of Judaism as an official religion and Rabbi Kaplan as Chief Rabbi were the result of Prime Minister Sali Berisha's efforts.

 Baháʼí Faith 
The Baháʼí Faith in Albania was introduced in the 1930s by Refo Çapari, an Albanian politician. Over the recent years several Baháʼí education centres have also been founded.

 Irreligion 

Irreligion is and has been historically present among Albanians. Nowadays, estimations of the size of the irreligious population vary widely. The self-declared atheist population has been given figures ranging from 2.5% to 8% to 9% while other estimates of irreligiosity have reported figures of 39% declaring as "atheists"(9%) or "nonreligious"(30%), 61% not saying religion was "important" to their lives, and 72% "non-practising".

Albanian national revivalists in the 19th century such as Faik Konica, Jani Vreto, and Zef Jubani were often anti-clerical in rhetoric (Konica said in 1897: "Every faith religion makes me puke", or ), but the first advocate of atheism in modern Albania is thought to have been Ismet Toto, a publicist and revolutionary whose 1934 anti-religious polemic, Grindje me klerin'', was one of the first known works advocating against the practice of religion itself in the Albanian language.

Under Socialist rule in 1967, leader Enver Hoxha persecuted and outlawed public religious practice and adopted state atheism.

Religious demography 

In the 2011 census, 56.7% of Albanians declared themselves to be Sunni Muslims, making Islam the largest religion in the country. Christianity was declared by 16.99% of the population, making it the 2nd largest religion in the country. The remaining portion of the population is either irreligious or belongs to other religious groups.

Muslims are found throughout the country, while Orthodox followers are concentrated in the south and Catholics are concentrated in the north. However, this division is not strict, particularly in many urban centers, which have mixed populations. Members of the Greek minority, concentrated in the south, are almost exclusively Orthodox and belong to the Orthodox Church of Albania. In addition to the four traditional religious groups, there are substantial numbers of followers of Protestant denominations, Baháʼís, Jehovah's Witnesses, the Church of Jesus Christ of Latter-day Saints (Mormons), and other religious groups.

According to other older sources, up to 75 percent of the population in Albania has declared no religious affiliation since the early 1990s.

The State Committee on Cults reported a total of 245 religious groups, organizations, and foundations in addition to the 4 traditional faiths. This number includes 34 different Islamic organizations and 189 Protestant organizations, mostly associated with the Albanian Evangelical Brotherhood (Vëllazëria Ungjillore Shqiptare).

These are only the official statistics of 1935, however, and since then much has changed.  Bashkim Zeneli, former Albanian ambassador to Greece, said that about 900,000 Albanians have emigrated to Greece in 20 years, and around 200,000 of them have returned to Albania. From this, around 240,000 are said to be Muslim by heritage, and around 85,000 have returned to Albania. Although they presently live in Albania, a lot of them continue to be Orthodox.

According to the 2007–2008 Gallup polls, 63% of Albanians state that religion does not play an important role in their lives.

In a census performed before World War II, a rough distribution of the population was 70% Muslim, 20% Eastern Orthodox, and 10% Roman Catholic. 65% of Albanian Muslims did not associate with particular sect of Islam in a Pew survey. In 1967, religious practices were officially banned in Albania, making the country the first and only constitutionally atheist state to ever exist. After the fall of state communism, in 1991 religious activities resumed. Among people who follow any of the four major religions in Albania, there is a mixture of various religious traditions and pagan traditions coming from the time before Christianity.

Interfaith marriages between Muslims and Christians are held to be "common" and "unremarkable" in Albania with little social repercussion, although there is little statistical data on their prevalence. During the communist period, it is known that during the period of 1950–1968, the rates of mixed marriages ranged from 1.6% in Shkodër, 4.3% in Gjirokastër to 15.5% among the textile workers in Tiranë. In the district of Shkodër they reached 5% in the year 1980.

However, even among those who declared themselves to be adherents of a religion, the majority of the population in Albania has a more secular interpretation of religion than that which would be found in other countries. In August 2012, a Pew Research study found that only 15% of the Muslim population for example, considers religion to be a very important factor in their lives, which was the lowest percentage in the world amongst countries with significant Muslim populations. Another survey conducted by Gallup Global Reports 2010 shows that religion plays a role to 39% of Albanians, and lists Albania as the thirteenth least religious country in the world. Also in Albania the majority of the males are not circumcised (as demanded by Islamic custom).

A medical study from 2008 in Tirana on the relationship between religious observance and acute coronary syndrome found out that 67% of Muslims and 55% of Christians were completely religiously non-observant. The regular attendance of religious institutions (at least once every 2 weeks) was low in both denominations (6% in Muslims and 9% in Christians), and weekly attendance was very low (2% and 1%, respectively). Frequent praying (at least 2 to 3 times per week) was higher in Christians (29%) than in Muslims (17%) Praying several times daily (as required of devout Muslims) was rare (2% in Muslims and 3% in Christians). Regular fasting during Ramadan or Lent was similarly low in Muslims and Christians (5% and 6%, respectively). Generally Christians in the study were more observant than Muslims (26% vs 17%).

A 2015 study on the Albanian youth aged 16–27 found that total of 80 percent of young people in Albania are not religion practitioners and practise their religion only during the main religious holidays and festivities. Specifically 23 percent of the respondents never practised their religion, while 61 percent practised it only in religious holidays. From the rest, 11 percent practised it 1–2 times a week, while 5 percent practised it every day.

In the European Values Survey in 2008, Albania had the highest unbelief in life after death among all other countries, with 74.3% not believing in it.

According to a WIN/Gallup International study in 2016 about the beliefs of the Albanians:

 80% believed there's God
 40% believed in life after death
 57% believed that people have a soul
 40% believed in hell
 42% believed in heaven

Estimates of the 2018 published Swiss Metadatabase of Religious Affiliation (SMRE) assume for the period 2000 (1996–2005) 8% Catholics, 15% Orthodox, 65.9% Muslims and 10.9% people with no religious affiliation. For the period 2010 (2006–2015) the SMRE estimates 8.7% Catholics, 9.1% Orthodox, 52.5% Muslim and 29.5% people with no religious affiliation.

Reactions to the 2011 Census 
The results of the 2011 census, however, have been criticized as questionable on a number of grounds. The Albanian Orthodox Church refused to recognize the results, saying they had drastically underrepresented the number of Orthodox Christians and noted various indications of this and ways in which it may have occurred. The Orthodox church claimed that from its own calculations, the Orthodox percentage should have been around 24%, rather than 6.75%. Meanwhile, the Bektashi leadership also lambasted the results, which even more drastically reduced their representation down to 2%, also rejected the results and said it would conduct its own census to refute the results.

Minority organizations of Greeks (mostly Orthodox) and Roma (mostly Muslim) also claimed that minorities were underrepresented and the Greek organization Omonia argued that this was linked to the under-representation of the Orthodox population.

The Orthodox percentage reported might be lower than the actual value due to boycotts of the census, but also because the census staff failed to contact a very large number of people in the south which is traditionally an Orthodox stronghold. The Orthodox Church said that according to a questionnaire it gave its followers during two Sunday liturgies in urban centers such as Durrësi, Berati and Korça, only 34% of its followers were actually contacted. The districts of Lushnja and Fieri (comprising the historic region of Myzeqe), which are far from any international borders and have an overwhelmingly ethnic Albanian population (except for a few Vlachs and Roma), were historically around 55% and 65% Orthodox historically, reported figures roughly were a factor of five times lower. This caused furor in the Albanian media, with an Orthodox Albanian politician Dritan Prifti who at the time was a prominent MP for the Myzeqe region saying that in Myzeqe alone there should be about 200,000 Orthodox Albanians- a bigger number than reported for the whole of Albania and referred to fluctuating census numbers regarding the Orthodox community as being due to an "anti-Orthodox agenda" in Albania.

The Albanian Catholic Bishops Conference also cast doubts on the census, complaining that many of its believers were not contacted.

According to the Council of Europe ("Third Opinion of the Council of Europe on Albania adopted 23.11.2011,") the results of the census "should be viewed with the utmost caution and calls on the authorities not to rely exclusively on the data on nationality collected during the census in determining its policy on the protection of national minorities."

Moreover, the World Council of Churches (WCC) general secretary Rev. Dr Olav Fykse Tveit has expressed concern at the methodology and results of the Albania Census 2011. He has raised questions in regard to the reliability of the process which, he said, has implications for the rights of religious minorities and religious freedoms guaranteed in the country's constitution. Tveit expressed this concern in letters issued at the beginning of May to the WCC president Archbishop Anastasios, to Prof. Dr Heiner Bielefeldt, United Nations Special Rapporteur on Freedom of Religion or Belief, and to the Albanian government.

There were other serious allegations about the conduct of the census workers that might have impacted on the 2011 census results. There were some reported cases where workers filled out the questionnaire about religion without even asking the participants or that the workers used pencils which were not allowed. In some cases communities declared that census workers never even contacted them. Additionally, the preliminary results released seemed to give widely different results, with 70% of respondents refusing to declare belief in any of the listed faiths, compared with only 16% of atheists and undeclared in the final results. It was reported in Albanian media that there were instances of pollsters telling respondents that the religion question would be filled out for them. Some Albanian commenters also argue that the census takers guessed religion based on the responders family names and that even the census responders did give an answer based on family origin and not actual religion.

Places of worship 

According to 2008 statistics from the religious communities in Albania, there are 1119 churches and 638 mosques in the country. The Roman Catholic mission declared 694 Catholic churches. The Christian Orthodox community, 425 Orthodox churches. The Muslim community, 568 mosques, and 70 Bektashi tekkes.

Freedom of religion 

The Constitution extends freedom of religion to all citizens and the government generally respects this right in practice. The Albanian Constitution declares no official religion and provides for equality of all religions; however, the predominant religious communities (Bektashi, Sunni Muslim, Orthodox and Roman Catholic) enjoy a greater degree of official recognition (e.g. national holidays) and social status based on their historical presence in the country. All registered religious groups have the right to hold bank accounts and to own property and buildings. Religious freedoms have in large part been secured by the generally amicable relationship among religions. The Ministry of Education has the right to approve the curricula of religious schools to ensure their compliance with national education standards while the State Committee on Cults oversees implementation. There are also 68 vocational training centers administered by religious communities.

Government policy and practice contributed to the generally free exercise of religion. The government is secular and the Ministry of Education asserts that public schools in the country are secular and that the law prohibits ideological and religious indoctrination. Religion is not taught in public schools.

See also 
 Secularism in Albania

Religions 
 Christianity in Albania
 Roman Catholicism in Albania
 Orthodoxy in Albania
 Islam in Albania
 Protestantism in Albania
 Irreligion in Albania
 Judaism in Albania

References

Sources

External links 
 Albanian Atheists
 Albanian Protestants
 Kisha Katolike Shkodër, Shkodra Catholic Church
 Famullia Gjakovë, Gjakova Catholic Church
 Catholic Church in Albania
 Albanian Orthodox Forum
 Orthodox Autocephalous Church of Albania
 Arbëresh Christian Eparchy
 The Bektashi Community
 Myftinia Shkodër, Mufti of Shkodra City
 Newspaper "Drita Islame"
 Magazine "Familja"

 
Society of Albania
Albanian culture